Tegerek is a village in the Naryn District, Naryn Region of Kyrgyzstan. Its population was 129 in 2021.

References 

 

Populated places in Naryn Region